James M. Kowalski (born October 30, 1957) is a retired United States Air Force lieutenant general who served as the Deputy Commander, United States Strategic Command from 2013 to 2015.

Military career

Kowalski entered active duty in 1980 through the ROTC program at the University of Cincinnati. He held a variety of operational commands, including a bomb squadron, an operations group, a bomb wing and an air control wing over his 35-year career. Kowalski retired from active duty on 1 September 2015.

Kowalski's contingency and wartime experience include command of the 2nd Operations Group when the unit deployed B-52s for combat during operations Noble Anvil and Allied Force, and command of the 28th Bomb Wing when it deployed B-1Bs for Operation Iraqi Freedom. From January 2003 to May 2003, Kowalski commanded the 405th Air Expeditionary Wing in Southwest Asia where he led a combined wing of B-1Bs, E-3s and KC-135s to provide strike, battle management, and air refueling for operations Iraqi Freedom, Enduring Freedom and Southern Watch. His previous staff assignments include Headquarters Air Combat Command, Headquarters U.S. Air Force and the Joint Chiefs of Staff. He served as Commander, Air Force Global Strike Command until October 2013, when he became Deputy Commander of U.S. Strategic Command. He retired on September 1, 2015.

Awards and decorations

Dates of promotion

References

United States Air Force generals
Living people
University of Cincinnati alumni
Recipients of the Air Medal
Recipients of the Legion of Merit
Recipients of the Defense Superior Service Medal
1957 births
American people of Polish descent